Hyperproteinemia is the state of having overly high levels of protein in the blood. This can occur due to monoclonal gammopathies such as multiple myeloma and after intravenous immunoglobulin has been given. It can result in a falsely low appearing sodium level (hyponatremia).

References

External links 

Blood proteins
Blood disorders